The ZIS-485, army designation BAV (Russian, БАВ, большой автомобиль водоплавающий - bolshoi avtomobil vodoplavayushchiy, big floating vehicle), is a Soviet amphibious transport, a copy of the WWII American DUKW.

During World War II, the Soviets received 586 DUKW-353 amphibious trucks under the Lend-Lease Act. The design was regarded as successful, so it was decided to build a similar domestic vehicle. Due to lack of own experience, the DUKW was copied, although with improvements enhancing its capability. The prototype was built in 1949 in ZIS subsidiary DAZ in Dnepropetrovsk, but a production started at ZIS factory, as ZIS-485. Introduced in 1952, it was intended to complement the GAZ-46 4x4 amphibious reconnaissance vehicle, but using the ZIS-151 6x6 truck (also used in the BTR-152) as its basis. Similar in size to the DUKW, which it resembles, the BAV has a rear tail gate making loading and unloading easier, rather than all cargo being loaded over the side by crane.  Also a platform was enlarged by 1/3, to 10.44 m².

Initially based on ZIS-151 truck, after the introduction of the improved ZIL-157 the vehicle was modernized using its components now bearing the designation ZIL-485A (army designation was BAV-A). Its production started in 1958, but it ceased in ZIL factory in 1959, after manufacturing 2005 ZIS/ZIL-485. It was planned to move the production to BAZ works in Bryansk, but only 24 vehicles were completed there by 1962.

The cargo body is open, but a canvas cover is available.

Propulsion in water is by means of propeller.

BAVs were used in service by Warsaw Pact Armies and in the Middle East up to the 1980s.

In use by the Soviet Union and its allies and client states the BAV was gradually replaced by the much larger tracked PTS amphibious vehicles.

Specification
Rear axle clearance:
Ground clearance:
Front track: 
Rear track: 
Turning radius: 
Maximum speed (loaded, highway): 
Tyres: 8¼x20 in (21x102 cm)
Fuel tank capacity: 2x 
Fuel consumption: 6.7 mpg
Top speed: 60 km/h (37 mph) (road)10 km/h (6.2 mph) (water)
Range: 480 km (298 mi)

See also

Landwasserschlepper

Notes

Sources
Fitzsimons, Bernard, ed. The Illustrated Encyclopedia of 20th Century Weapons & Warfare (London: Phoebus, 1978), Volume 5, p. 476-7, "BTR".
Hogg, Ian V., and Weeks, John.  The Illustrated Encyclopedia of Military Vehicles. London: Hamblyn Publishing Group Limited, 1980, p. 308-9, "BAV-485".
Prochko, Yevgeniy. «Bolshoi avtomobil vodoplavayushchiy». „Tekhnika i Vooruzheniye”. 03/2009. p. 15-22 (in Russian).
Prochko, Yevgeniy. «Bolshoi avtomobil vodoplavayushchiy». „Tekhnika i Vooruzheniye”. 04/2009. p. 16-22 (in Russian).
AMW - Agencja Mienia Wojskowego
ZIS-485 at denisovets.narod.ru

Wheeled amphibious vehicles
Military vehicles of the Soviet Union
Military vehicles introduced in the 1950s